Michael Simeon Visaroff  (December 18, 1889 – February 27, 1951) was a Russian actor.

Biography
Visaroff was born Mikhail Semenonovich Vizarov (Russian: Михаил Семёнович Визаров) in Moscow, Russian Empire. He was a graduate of the Russian Principal Dramatic School.

Visaroff started his career on stage: In July 1922, Visaroff came to the United States with a group from the Kamerny Theatre in Moscow. With a 14-week leave of absence from Russia, the group planned to present 12 plays, each lasting one week, in a Broadway theater.

He eventually made the transition to film, appearing in more than 110 films between 1925 and 1952. He was best known for his uncredited appearance in an early scene of Dracula (1931) as the nervous Hungarian innkeeper who, as Renfield is traveling to meet the Count, warns him about the actual existence of vampires.

Personal life
When Visaroff came to the US in July 1922 he was already married to Nina Visaroff, according to the passenger list, and they had a daughter named Lydia. Yet they got married again in 1924 in New York. His age in the passenger list is stated as 32 and in the naturalization file dated in March 1929, is given as 39 meaning that he was born in 1889 and not in 1892 as he claimed later in his life.

He died in Hollywood, California, from pneumonia in 1951.

Partial filmography

 Paris (1926)
 The Nickel-Hopper (1926)
 Valencia (1926)
 The Sunset Derby (1927)
 Two Arabian Knights (1927)
 Ramona (1928)
 Tempest (1928)
 The Night Bird (1928)
 We Americans (1928)
 Lullaby (1929)
 Marquis Preferred (1929)
 House of Horror (1929)
 Disraeli (1929)
 Du Barry, Woman of Passion (1930)
 Morocco (1930)
 Dracula (1931) (uncredited)
 Mata Hari (1931) (uncredited)
 Chinatown After Dark (1931)
 Arizona Terror (1931)
 Six Hours to Live (1932)
 Mark of the Vampire (1935)
 The Magnificent Brute (1936)
 The Soldier and the Lady (1937)
 I'll Give a Million (1938)
 Paris Honeymoon (1939)
 The Flying Deuces (1939) (uncredited)
 Everything Happens at Night (1939)
 Charlie Chan at the Wax Museum (1940)
 Reunion in France (1942) (uncredited)
 Paris After Dark (1943) - Paul
 For Whom the Bell Tolls (1943)
 Yolanda and the Thief (1945)
 Don Ricardo Returns (1946)

References

External links

 
 
 
 
 

1892 births
1951 deaths
American people of Russian descent
Deaths from pneumonia in California
Emigrants from the Russian Empire to the United States
Male actors from Moscow
Russian male film actors
Russian male silent film actors
20th-century American male actors